Aristobulus V of Chalcis was a son of Herod of Chalcis and his first wife Mariamne. Herod of Chalcis, ruler of Chalcis in Iturea, was a grandson of Herod the Great through his father, Aristobulus IV. Mariamne was a granddaughter of Herod the Great through her mother, Olympias; hence Aristobulus was a great-grandson of Herod the Great on both sides of his family.

Life
Aristobulus was married to Salome after the death of her first husband, Philip the Tetrarch. With her Aristobulus had three sons: Herod, Agrippa, and Aristobulus Three coins with portraits of him and Salome have been found.

Aristobulus did not directly succeed his father as ruler of the Chalcis. Rather, upon his father's death in 48 AD, the emperor Claudius gave the realm to Aristobulus' first cousin, Herod Agrippa II, but only as a tetrarchy. In 53 AD Agrippa II was forced to renounce the rule over tetrarchy of Chalcis, but he was given the title of king and rule over the territories previously governed by Philip the Tetrarch (also known as Herod Philip II) and Lysanias instead. Subsequently, Aristobulus was given tetrarchy of Chalcis in 57 AD. He reigned as tetrarch of Chalcis until his death in 92 AD, when the territory became part of the Roman province Syria.

He has been identified with the Aristobulus appointed by Nero as King of Armenia Minor in 55 AD, who participated with his forces in the Roman–Parthian War of 58–63, receiving a small portion of Greater Armenia in exchange. This Aristobulus was displaced from Armenia Minor in 72 AD, but is thought to be the "Aristobulus of Chalcidice" who supported Lucius Caesennius Paetus, proconsul of Syria, in the war against Antiochus of Commagene in 73 AD, and was in consequence compensated with a new kingdom, "probably Chalcis ad Belum" (modern Qinnasrin, in northern Syria. Assuming all these Aristobuli were indeed the same person, he would seem to have been ruler, at various times, of the Iturean Chalcis, Armenia Minor, and Chalcis ad Belum.

See also
Herodian dynasty
Herodian kingdom
List of Hasmonean and Herodian rulers
1st century in Lebanon

References

Further reading
Gillman, Florence Morgan. Herodias: At Home in that Fox's Den, Liturgical Press, 2003 

|-

|-

1st-century Herodian rulers
Herodian dynasty
Roman client rulers
1st-century monarchs in the Middle East
1st-century Jews
Salome